The  is a commuter railway line in Sanda, Hyōgo Prefecture operated by Kobe Electric Railway. 

Although Yokoyama is the line terminus, all trains continue on the Sanda Line to Sanda.

History
The Yokoyama - Flower Town section opened in 1991,  gauge and electrified at 1500 VDC. The line was extended to Woody Town Chūō in 1996.

The line is single track, but the corridor allows for duplication if required in the future.

Stations

Ridership

References 

Railway lines in Japan
Rail transport in Hyōgo Prefecture
Railway lines opened in 1991
1991 establishments in Japan